The Alaska Attorney General is the chief legal advisor to the government of the State of Alaska and to its governor. The Attorney General is appointed by the governor and confirmed by the Alaska Legislature. The position has existed since the early days of the Territory of Alaska, though it was an elected rather than an appointed position prior to statehood. The Attorney General also serves as the Commissioner of the Alaska Department of Law, and is the only commissioner of a principal department of Alaska state government not referred to as "Commissioner" in normal usage.

List of attorneys general
In the earliest days of the Alaska Territory, the Territorial Counsel served as the de facto attorney general. Only one person, John H. Cobb, served in this position. The 2nd Alaska Territorial Legislature in 1915 created the Office of the Attorney General, to become effective after the 1916 general election. The attorney general's position was an elected position during the entirety of territorial days, as opposed to under statehood, in which it has been a position appointed by the governor since 1959. The following is a list of attorneys general in Alaska.

Alaska Territory

State of Alaska

References

External links

 About the Attorney General at Alaska Department of Law
 Alaska Attorney General articles at ABA Journal
 News and Commentary at FindLaw
 Alaska Statutes at Law.Justia.com
 U.S. Supreme Court Opinions - "Cases with title containing: State of Alaska" at FindLaw
 Alaska Bar Association
 Alaska Attorney General Craig W. Richards profile at National Association of Attorneys General
 Press releases at Alaska Department of Law

 
1916 establishments in Alaska